Eric Jakeman  (born 1939) is a British mathematical physicist specialising in the statistics and quantum statistics of waves. He is an Emeritus Professor at the University of Nottingham.

Education 
Jakeman was educated at The Brunts School in  Mansfield, England.  He received a degree in mathematical physics from Birmingham University in 1960, and a PhD in superconductivity theory in 1963.

Career 
He was the head of the scattering and quantum optics section at the Defence Research Agency, a visiting professor at Imperial College London, an honorary secretary of the Institute of Physics from 1994 until 2003, and finally a Professor of Applied Statistical Optics at the University of Nottingham from 1996. He was a member of the Council of the European Physical Society from 1985 until 2003.

Awards and honours 
In 1977, Jakeman received the Maxwell Medal of the Institute of Physics for his work on statistical optics. He was elected a Fellow of the Royal Society (FRS) in 1990. His certificate of election reads:

References 

Living people
British physicists
British mathematicians
Fellows of the Royal Society
1939 births
Alumni of the University of Birmingham